Thompson Falls Dam is a dam in Sanders County, Montana, in the northwestern part of the state.

A complex of four hydropower dams stand on the Clark Fork River in downtown Thompson Falls, Montana:

Operations here began in 1915 with original construction on a set of natural falls.

Montana Power Company originally built the dam, PPL Corporation purchased it in 1997 and sold it to NorthWestern Corporation in 2014. The island between the dams contains a public park with hiking trails, picnic tables, and scenic overlooks. The site and adjacent buildings comprise the Thompson Falls Hydroelectric Dam Historic District, on the National Register of Historic Places.

References

Dams in Montana
Reservoirs in Montana
NorthWestern Corporation dams
Buildings and structures in Sanders County, Montana
Landforms of Sanders County, Montana
Dams completed in 1915
1915 establishments in Montana
Thompson Falls, Montana